Ascendants is the fourth studio album by American deathcore band Oceano. It was released on March 23, 2015, via Earache Records.

Background 

Adam Warren of Oceano commented "This album is an evolution of our brand of heaviness. It is our most focused release ever and contains a concept that elevates the band onto a higher plane."

Critical reception 

AllMusic gave the album a 0/5 rating with the review stating "the sound of Ascendants is pure pummeling deathcore, more closely aligned with the monstrous attack displayed on their 2009 debut, Depths." Ultimate Guitar suggested the album as unoriginal, stating "there's very little that makes Ascendants feel like new music."

The album was described as dark, grim, brooding, hopeless deathcore with an impressive demonstrated range of vocals. Connor Welsh of New Transcendence wrote "it showcases a band not just at the peak of their performance, but towering with immensity and an iron rule over the remainder of [the] heavy music scene." Metalsucks had described the album as "having the same sound, the same rhythm, the same everything."

Track listing

Personnel 
Band line-up
Adam Warren - vocals, lyrics
Michael Kasper - lead guitar
Scott Smith - rhythm guitar
Chris Wagner - bass
Chason Westmoreland - drums

Production
Dusty Peterson - Cover art
Mark Leary - Layout
Nick Nativo - Producer, Engineer
Oceano - Producer
Will Putney - Mixing, Mastering
Michael Kasper - Engineer
Scott Smith - Engineer

Charts

References 

Oceano (band) albums
2015 albums
Earache Records albums